The 1923 Santa Clara Missionites football team was an American football team that represented Santa Clara University as an independent during the 1923 college football season. In their first season under head coach Eddie Kienholz, the Broncos compiled a 3–4–1 record.

Schedule

References

Santa Clara
Santa Clara Broncos football seasons
Santa Clara Missionites football